Cheongwansan (천관산 / 天冠山) is a mountain in Jeollanam-do, western South Korea.

References

Mountains of South Jeolla Province
Jangheung County
Mountains of South Korea